Mount Sedgwick may refer to:

 Mount Sedgwick (British Columbia) 
 Mount Sedgwick (New Mexico)
 Mount Sedgwick (Tasmania)
 Mount Sedgwick (Yukon)